Stefan Kapłaniak "Cenek" (10 April 1933 – 8 August 2021) was a Polish sprint canoer who competed from the late 1950s to the mid-1960s. Competing in three Summer Olympics, he won a bronze medal in the K-2 1000 m event at Rome in 1960.

Kapłaniak also won two gold medals at the 1958 ICF Canoe Sprint World Championships in Prague, earning them in the K-1 500 m and K-2 500 m events.

References

 Profile at Polish Olympic Committee website

External links

1933 births
2021 deaths
Canoeists at the 1956 Summer Olympics
Canoeists at the 1960 Summer Olympics
Canoeists at the 1964 Summer Olympics
Olympic canoeists of Poland
Olympic bronze medalists for Poland
Medalists at the 1960 Summer Olympics
Polish male canoeists
Olympic medalists in canoeing
People from Nowy Targ County
ICF Canoe Sprint World Championships medalists in kayak
Sportspeople from Lesser Poland Voivodeship